Botanical Garden station (also known as Botanical Garden–East 200th Street station) is a commuter rail stop on the Metro-North Railroad's Harlem Line, serving the Bedford Park section of the Bronx, New York City. The station is located just north of the intersection of Southern Boulevard and Bedford Park Boulevard (East 200th Street) adjacent to northern Bronx Park and the New York Botanical Garden.

History
Prior to the establishment of the Botanical Garden station, its location was the former site of Bedford Park station, a railroad station that connected to a privately owned one-mile spur leading west to the Jerome Park Racetrack, which contained its own station of the same name. The racetrack was closed on October 4, 1894 to make way for the installation of the Jerome Park Reservoir, and the spur was used for construction of the reservoir until 1906.

Like the site for which it was named, Botanical Garden station originates back to the 1890s, although it originally had structures on both sides of the tracks. The structure that serves the gardens itself on the north side of the tracks still exists, while the old station house on the southbound platforms was torn down. Botanical Gardens station was south of a derailment on February 16, 1907 that resulted in 20 deaths and 150 injuries. This was one day after New York Central Railroad electrified the Harlem Line in reaction to being chastised in the press after the Park Avenue Tunnel accident of 1902. Some sources have mistakenly referred to the site of the crash as being at Woodlawn station. From 1920 to 1973, there was also a connection to the 200th Street station along the IRT Third Avenue Line over the intersection of Webster Avenue and Bedford Park Boulevard just southwest of the station.

As with many NYCRR stations in the Bronx, the station became a Penn Central station once the NYC & Pennsylvania Railroads merged in 1968. Penn Central's continuous financial despair throughout the 1970s forced them to turn over their commuter service to the Metropolitan Transportation Authority. Sometime between 1975 and 1981, MTA demolished the southbound station house and replaced it with aluminum and Plexiglas bus shelters. The station and the railroad were turned over to Conrail in 1976, and eventually became part of the MTA's Metro-North Railroad in 1983.

Station layout
The station has two high-level side platforms, each eight cars long.

References

External links

 Station from Google Maps Street View
Platforms from Google Maps Street View
Overpass from Google Maps Street View

Metro-North Railroad stations in New York City
Former New York Central Railroad stations
Railway stations in the Bronx
Bedford Park, Bronx